Yevgeniya Kuznetsova (born 1 January 1936) is a Soviet athlete. She competed in the women's discus throw at the 1960 Summer Olympics and the 1964 Summer Olympics.

References

1936 births
Living people
Athletes (track and field) at the 1960 Summer Olympics
Athletes (track and field) at the 1964 Summer Olympics
Soviet female discus throwers
Olympic athletes of the Soviet Union
Place of birth missing (living people)